Disconnect Me is a song written by Peter Boström and Tony Nilsson, and performed by Marie Serneholt at Melodifestivalen 2009. The song participated in the competition inside Scandinavium in Gothenburg on 7 February 2009, but was knocked out ending up 6th.

The single peaked at 46th position at the Swedish singles chart and was also tested for Svensktoppen on 1 March 2009 but failed to enter the chart.

Charts

References

See also
 disconnect.me a privacy app for browser, desktop and mobile.

2009 singles
English-language Swedish songs
Marie Serneholt songs
Melodifestivalen songs of 2009
Songs written by Peter Boström
Songs written by Tony Nilsson
2009 songs